The Marshall ShredMaster (also known as the Shred Master) is a discontinued distortion pedal which was manufactured by Marshall Amps.

It was the high-gain pedal of a triad, also including the Marshall DriveMaster and the Marshall BluesBreaker. All of which were created to represent a certain Marshall Amplifier in an effects pedal.

The pedal is powered by 9V battery or external power supply.

Controls
The ShredMaster has five knobs, which are, from left to right:
Gain – controls intensity of the drive
Bass – controls lower frequencies
Contour – controls mid frequencies
Treble – controls high-end response
Volume – controls overall volume level

ShredMaster users
Notable musicians who have used the ShredMaster include:
Jonny Greenwood and Thom Yorke of Radiohead
Gaz Coombes of Supergrass
James Dean Bradfield of Manic Street Preachers
Alex James of Blur
Kevin Shields of My Bloody Valentine
Sam Koisser of Peace

Notes

External links
 The Official Marshall Amplification Website

Effects units